South Indian International Movie Awards, also known as the SIIMA Awards, rewards the artistic and technical achievements of the South Indian film industry. It was launched in 2012 by Vishnu Vardhan Induri and Brinda Prasad Adusimilli to appreciate film makers from across the South Indian film industries: Telugu cinema, Tamil cinema, Kannada cinema, and Malayalam cinema, and provide a platform to promote South Indian films in international markets.

History
The ceremony was instituted in 2012 by Vishnu Vardhan Induri, the founder of Celebrity Cricket League. Adusumilli Brinda Prasad is the chairperson of SIIMA. The Awards are presented in separate parts on two different days. On the first day the most promising upcoming South Indian film artistes are honoured at the Generation Next Awards, while the second day is reserved for the main SIIMA Awards. The Award nominees are selected by a jury of senior artistes and professionals and voted for by public polling. The first SIIMA ceremony was held on 21 & 22 June 2012 at the Dubai World Trade Centre.

It is one of the most prominent entertainment award ceremonies in India. Unlike other South Indian film awards, SIIMA holds its ceremony abroad. However, in 2021, SIIMA was conducted in Hyderabad, India owing to the travel restrictions due to COVID-19 pandemic.

In 2017, Vibri Media Group have announced that it is going to add SIIMA Short Film Awards category to recognise makers and actors of short films. In September 2017, a twitter emoji was released on the platform.

Ceremonies

Award categories

Kannada 

 SIIMA Award for Best Film – Kannada
 SIIMA Award for Best Actor – Kannada
 SIIMA Award for Best Actress – Kannada
 SIIMA Award for Best Director – Kannada
 SIIMA Award for Best Lyricist – Kannada
 SIIMA Award for Best Male Debut – Kannada
 SIIMA Award for Best Female Debut – Kannada
 SIIMA Award for Best Debut Director – Kannada
 SIIMA Award for Best Debut Producer – Kannada
 SIIMA Award for Best Music Director – Kannada
 SIIMA Award for Best Cinematographer – Kannada
 SIIMA Award for Best Supporting Actor – Kannada
 SIIMA Award for Best Supporting Actress – Kannada
 SIIMA Award for Best Male Playback Singer – Kannada
 SIIMA Award for Best Female Playback Singer – Kannada
 SIIMA Award for Best Actor in a Negative Role – Kannada
 SIIMA Award for Best Comedian – Kannada
 SIIMA Critics Award for Best Actor – Kannada
 SIIMA Critics Award for Best Actress – Kannada

Malayalam 

 SIIMA Award for Best Film – Malayalam
 SIIMA Award for Best Director – Malayalam
 SIIMA Award for Best Actor – Malayalam
 SIIMA Award for Best Actress – Malayalam
 SIIMA Award for Best Supporting Actor – Malayalam
 SIIMA Award for Best Supporting Actress – Malayalam
 SIIMA Award for Best Music Director – Malayalam
 SIIMA Award for Best Lyricist – Malayalam
 SIIMA Award for Best Male Playback Singer – Malayalam
 SIIMA Award for Best Female Playback Singer – Malayalam
 SIIMA Award for Best Actor in a Negative Role – Malayalam
 SIIMA Critics Award for Best Actor – Malayalam
 SIIMA Critics Award for Best Actress – Malayalam
 SIIMA Award for Best Debut Director – Malayalam
 SIIMA Award for Best Debut Producer – Malayalam
 SIIMA Award for Best Male Debut – Malayalam
 SIIMA Award for Best Female Debut – Malayalam
 SIIMA Award for Best Cinematographer – Malayalam
 SIIMA Award for Best Comedian – Malayalam
 SIIMA Critics Award for Best Actor – Malayalam
 SIIMA Critics Award for Best Actress – Malayalam

Tamil 

 SIIMA Award for Best Film – Tamil
 SIIMA Award for Best Director – Tamil
 SIIMA Award for Best Actor – Tamil
 SIIMA Award for Best Actress – Tamil
 SIIMA Award for Best Supporting Actor – Tamil
 SIIMA Award for Best Supporting Actress – Tamil
 SIIMA Award for Best Music Director – Tamil
 SIIMA Award for Best Lyricist – Tamil
 SIIMA Award for Best Male Playback Singer – Tamil
 SIIMA Award for Best Female Playback Singer – Tamil
 SIIMA Award for Best Actor in a Negative Role – Tamil
 SIIMA Award for Best Debut Director – Tamil
 SIIMA Award for Best Debut Producer – Tamil
 SIIMA Award for Best Male Debut – Tamil
 SIIMA Award for Best Female Debut – Tamil
 SIIMA Award for Best Cinematographer – Tamil
 SIIMA Award for Best Comedian – Tamil
 SIIMA Critics Award for Best Actor – Tamil
 SIIMA Critics Award for Best Actress – Tamil

Telugu 

 SIIMA Award for Best Film – Telugu
 SIIMA Award for Best Director – Telugu
 SIIMA Award for Best Actor – Telugu
 SIIMA Award for Best Actress – Telugu
 SIIMA Award for Best Supporting Actor – Telugu
 SIIMA Award for Best Supporting Actress – Telugu
 SIIMA Award for Best Music Director – Telugu
 SIIMA Award for Best Lyricist – Telugu
 SIIMA Award for Best Male Playback Singer – Telugu
 SIIMA Award for Best Female Playback Singer – Telugu
SIIMA Award for Best Actor in a Negative Role – Telugu
 SIIMA Award for Best Male Debut – Telugu
 SIIMA Award for Best Female Debut – Telugu
 SIIMA Award for Best Debut Director – Telugu
 SIIMA Award for Best Debut Producer – Telugu
 SIIMA Award for Best Cinematographer – Telugu
 SIIMA Award for Best Comedian – Telugu
 SIIMA Critics Award for Best Actor – Telugu
 SIIMA Critics Award for Best Actress – Telugu

Other
SIIMA Lifetime Achievement Award
Best Fight Choreographer
Best Dance Choreographer
Young icon award (Male and Female)

References

External links
 Official website
 

 
Indian film awards
South India
2012 establishments in Andhra Pradesh
Cinema of Andhra Pradesh
Awards established in 2012
Telugu film awards
Andhra Pradesh awards